Innocence and Desire is a 1974 Italian commedia sexy all'italiana film directed by Massimo Dallamano.

Plot 
A young seminarian is back to his family to reflect on the sincerity of his mystical vocation. Here, in a pleasant Sicilian province, he has to face several sexual temptations, even encouraged by his grandfather Don Salvatore, who suffers from satyriasis. When the grandfather dies, Carmela, his young stepmother, will definitively discourage the seminarian from his religious intentions.

Cast 

 Lionel Stander: Salvatore Niscemi
 Edwige Fenech: Carmela Paternò
 Roberto Cenci: Tonino Niscemi
 Vittorio Caprioli: Vincenzo Niscemi
 Anna Maria Pescatori: Lola 
 Nerina Montagnani: Lola's maid
 Enzo Andronico: Driver

See also     
 List of Italian films of 1974

References

External links

 

1974 films
1970s sex comedy films
Films directed by Massimo Dallamano
Commedia sexy all'italiana
Films about clerical celibacy
Films about sexual repression
1974 comedy films
1970s Italian films